The simsimiyya (Egyptian Arabic: سمسمية, and سنسمية sinsimia/sinsimiyya; pl. simsimiyyāt/sinsimiyyāt) is a box or bowl lyre used in Egypt, Saudi Arabia and South Yemen.  Models exist with both circular soundboxes as well as rectangular. In the past, Egyptian models had 5 strings, while those in Yemen had 6. The strings are held in place by pegs instead of tuning rings. Today, images of the instrument in Egypts may show 12 strings.

It is used in Egypt in certain genres of Egyptian music, including Sawahli (coastal) music, which is a type of popular Egyptian music from the country's northern coast that is based around ancient Egyptian instrumentals. The simsimiyya was probably introduced to the country's northern coast from the Nile valley in the 19th century by Egyptian workers in the Suez Canal. It is also used in other genres of Egyptian music. Well known Egyptian bands that feature the simsimiyya as a main instrument include el-Tanboura, which uses other ancient Egyptian instruments.

The simsimiyya is often used to accompany an Egyptian dance called bambutiyya, as well as among the groups of Egyptian musicians known as suhbagiyya, in the cities of Port Said and Ismailia.

It is sometimes used in other countries neighboring Egypt as well.

References

Shiloah, Amnon. "The Simsimiyya: A Stringed Instrument of the Red Sea Area." Asian Music, vol. 4, no. 1, Near East-Turkestan Issue (1972), pp. 15-26.

External links
Simsimiyya page
Simsimiyya photos

See also
Kissar
Krar
Tanbūra
el-Tanboura
Music of Egypt

Egyptian musical instruments
Ancient Egyptian musical instruments
Egyptian music
Ancient Egypt
Lyres